Hajjiabad (also Romanized as Ḩājjīābād) is a village in Nurabad Rural District, in the Central District of Delfan County, Lorestan Province, Iran. At the 2006 census, its population was 223, in 41 families.

References 

Towns and villages in Delfan County